Eberhard Zangger (born 1958 in Kamen, West Germany) is a Swiss geoarchaeologist, corporate communications consultant and publicist. Since 1994 he has been advocating the view that a Luwian civilization existed in Western Asia Minor during the 2nd millennium BC. In 2014 he established the international non-profit foundation Luwian Studies, whose president he is.

Life and work

Eberhard Zangger studied geology and paleontology at the University of Kiel and obtained a PhD from Stanford University in 1988. After this he was a senior research associate in the Department of Earth Sciences at the University of Cambridge (1988–91). In June 1991 he founded the consultancy office Geoarcheology International in Zurich, Switzerland, from where he participated in archaeological projects in the eastern Mediterranean each year until 1999.
 
Zangger began concentrating on geoarchaeology in 1982. His early research work and discoveries included the coastal situation of Dimini in Neolithic Central Greece, the extent of Lake Lerna in the Argive Plain, the age and function of the Mycenaean river diversion and extent of the lower town of Tiryns, the insular character of Asine, the artificial harbor of Nestor at Pylos, including its clean water flushing mechanism, and a human-made dam in Minoan Monastiraki in central Crete.
 
In 1992, Zangger suggested that Plato used an Egyptian version of a story about Troy for his legendary account of Atlantis. Zangger based his argument on comparisons between Mycenaean culture and Plato's account of the Greek civilization facing Atlantis, as well as parallels between the recollections of the Trojan War and the war between Greece and Atlantis. He recognized similarities between the Sea People invasions and the aggressors described by Plato and he also saw parallels between the Sea People invasions and the Trojan War. In 1992 Zangger arrived at the conclusion that Troy must have been much bigger than the archeological scholarship had presumed, and that the city must have had artificial harbors inside the modern floodplain. In a 1993 article, Zangger listed many commonalities between Plato's description of Atlantis and different accounts of Troy as it looked in the late Bronze Age.

In 1994, Zangger presented a chronology of political and economic developments in the eastern Mediterranean during the 13th century BC. This time, Zangger interpreted the legend of the Trojan War to be the memory of a momentous war which led to the collapse of many countries around the eastern Mediterranean around 1200 BC. Zangger's overall research goal was to find an explanation for the end of the Bronze Age in the eastern Mediterranean around 1200 BC. In contrast to the archaeological scholarship of the time, Zangger attributed greater importance to the states in Western Anatolia that are known from Hittite documents, including the Luwian kingdoms Arzawa, Mira, Wilusa, Lukka and Seha River Land. In Zangger's view, if these petty kingdoms had stood united, they would have matched the economic and military importance of Mycenaean Greece or Minoan Crete.

In a review of the books The Flood from Heaven and Ein neuer Kampf um Troia in the Journal of Field Archeology, the US prehistorian Daniel Pullen of Florida State University emphasized Zangger's approach. Zangger, Pullen says, “applies the rigors of scientific methodology to explaining the end of the Bronze Age in the eastern Mediterranean.”

In his third book, Zangger turned to developments in the 12th century BC after the Trojan War. According to Zangger, scattered groups of survivors of the Sea People invasions and the Trojan War founded new settlements in Italy and Syria/Palestine from which the Etruscan and Phoenician cultures emerged. Zangger also argued against the overrating of natural disasters as a trigger for cultural change. In his opinion, natural scientists and specialists in urban development and hydraulic engineering should become more often involved in archaeology.

In collaboration with the Federal Institute for Geosciences and Natural Resources in Hannover, Zanier proposed a geophysical exploration of the plain of Troy to locate settlement layers and artificial port basins. The Turkish Ministry of Culture did not grant permission to conduct this project. In 2001 Zangger said that because of a vigorous scholarly dispute with the Troy excavator Manfred Korfmann, Zangger was ceasing his research.

In the fall of 1999, Zangger became a business consultant specializing in corporate communications and public relations. In 2002 he founded science communication GmbH, a consultancy firm for corporate communications.

Luwian Studies Foundation 
Since April 2014, Zangger is president of the board of trustees of the international non-profit foundation Luwian Studies. The commercial register of Canton Zurich (Switzerland) states as the foundation's purpose “the exploration of the second millennium BC in western Asia Minor and the dissemination of knowledge about it”. The Board of Trustees includes Ivo Hajnal, Jorrit Kelder, Matthias Oertle and Jeffrey Spier.

In May 2016, Luwian Studies went public with a website in German, English and Turkish. At the same time Zangger's book appeared: The Luwian Civilization – The missing link in the Aegean Bronze Age. As part of its research, the foundation has systematically catalogued over 340 extensive settlement sites of the Middle and Late Bronze Age in Western Asia Minor. These sites are presented in a public database on the website.

James Mellaart’s Estate 
In June 2017, Zangger received unpublished documents from the estate of the British prehistorian James Mellaart, which the latter had marked to be of particular importance. The material in Mellaart's estate referred to two groups of documents, both of which were allegedly found in 1878 in a village called Beyköy, 34 kilometers north of Afyonkarahisar in western Turkey. On the one hand there was a Luwian hieroglyphic inscription (“HL Beyköy 2”) on limestone which must have been composed around 1180 BC. Mellaart, however, only possessed a drawing of this inscription. According to Mellaart's notes, in addition to this, bronze tablets bearing Hittite texts in Akkadian cuneiform were also found at Beyköy (“Beyköy text”). These described the political events during almost the entire Bronze Age from the perspective of rulers in western Asia Minor. Mellaart only possessed English translations of these documents.

In December 2017, Zangger and the Dutch linguist Fred Woudhuizen published in the Dutch archeology journal Talanta the Luwian hieroglyphic drawings (including texts from Edremit, Yazılıtaş, Dağardı and Şahankaya) that were retrieved from Mellaart's estate. However, early in 2018 Zangger distanced himself from Mellaart and accused him of having falsified documents. Further research in Mellaart's former study in London in February 2018 had revealed that Mellaart had completely invented the (allegedly cuneiform) “Beyköy text”. On the other hand, Woudhuizen, who published together with Zangger, continues to believe that the Luwian hieroglyphic inscription HL Beyköy 2 is certainly not forged by Mellaart and probably genuine.

Yazılıkaya 
In June 2019 Zangger together with the archeologist and astronomer Rita Gautschy of the University of Basel, published a new interpretation of the Hittite rock sanctuary Yazılıkaya at Ḫattuša, according to which the sequence of rock reliefs in chamber A could have been used as a lunisolar calendar.

Selected publications
 The Landscape Evolution of the Argive Plain (Greece). Paleo-Ecology, Holocene Depositional History and Coastline Changes. PhD dissertation at Stanford University, University Microfilm International, Ann Arbor, Michigan 1988
 Prehistoric Coastal Environments in Greece: The Vanished Landscapes of Dimini Bay and Lake Lerna. Journal of Field Archaeology 18 (1): 1-15. 1991
 Geoarchaeology of the Argolid. Argolid, volume 2. Edited by the German Archaeological Institute. Gebrüder Mann Verlag, 149 pages, 1993 
 The Island of Asine: A paleogeographic reconstruction. Opuscula Atheniensa XX.15: 221-239. 1994
 Zangger, Eberhard; Michael Timpson, Sergei Yazvenko, Falko Kuhnke & Jost Knauss: The Pylos Regional Archaeological Project; Landscape Evolution and Site Preservation, Hesperia 66 (4): 549-641. 1997
 Athanassas, Constantin et al.: Exploring Paelogreographic Conditions at Two Paleolithic Sites in Navarino, Southwest Greece, Dated by Optically Stimulated Luminescence. Geoarchaeology 27: 237-258. 2012
 Plato’s Atlantis Account: A distorted recollection of the Trojan War. Oxford Journal of Archaeology 18 (1): 77-87. 1993
 The Flood from Heaven – Deciphering the Atlantis Legend. Sidgwick & Jackson, London; 256 pages 1992 
 Ein neuer Kampf um Troia – Archäologie in der Krise. Droemer Verlag. Munich, 352 pages 1994 
 The Future of the Past: Archaeology in the 21st Century. Weidenfeld & Nicolson, London, 2001 
 Zangger, Eberhard, Michael Timpson, Sergei Yazvenko and Horst Leiermann: Searching for the Ports of Troy. In: Environmental Reconstruction in Mediterranean Landscape, 
 Some Open Questions About the Plain of Troia. In: Troia and the Troad – Scientific Approaches. Springer, Berlin, 317-324. 2003

Notes

References 
 Edge: Eberhard Zangger

Archaeologists from North Rhine-Westphalia
Living people
1958 births
People from Kamen